Federal College of Education Abeokuta (FCEA), (formerly known as Federal Advanced Teachers College) is a public institution authorized with issuance of National Certificate in Education (NCE) to successful graduating students. It was founded in 1976 at Osiele, Ogun State, south west Nigeria. The current Provost is Dr. Rafiu Adekola Soyele. The college runs three programmes: the NCE, a degree in affiliation with University of Ibadan and Lagos State University, and PGDE.

Background

The college was the first tertiary institution in Ogun State. The school started operation in 1976, at a site shared with Abeokuta Grammar School, before relocating to the permanent site in 1978 at Osiele. In July 2020, the institution was shut down for two weeks when a staff died of COVID-19 complications and two others tested positive to the virus.

Schools 
The institution offers several courses under the following schools:

 School of Arts and Social Sciences
 School of Education
 School of Languages
 School of Science
 School of Vocational Studies
The institution also enables students to gain experience in their different fields of study through the SIWES programme.

References

External links
 Federal College of Education, Abeokuta Official Website
 School website

1976 establishments in Nigeria
Universities and colleges in Abeokuta
Federal colleges of education in Nigeria
Educational institutions established in 1976